In enzymology, a N-methylphosphoethanolamine cytidylyltransferase is an enzyme that catalyzes the chemical reaction

CTP + N-methylethanolamine phosphate  diphosphate + CDP-N-methylethanolamine

Thus, the two substrates of this enzyme are CTP and N-methylethanolamine phosphate, whereas its two products are diphosphate and CDP-N-methylethanolamine.

This enzyme belongs to the family of transferases, specifically those transferring phosphorus-containing nucleotide groups (nucleotidyltransferases).  The systematic name of this enzyme class is CTP:N-methylethanolamine-phosphate cytidylyltransferase. Other names in common use include monomethylethanolamine phosphate cytidylyltransferase, and CTP:P-MEA cytidylyltransferase.

References 

 

EC 2.7.7
Enzymes of unknown structure